Broadway Building may refer to:

Broadway Building (Lorain, Ohio), listed on the National Register of Historic Places in Lorain County, Ohio
Broadway Building (Portland, Oregon), listed on the National Register of Historic Places in Multnomah County, Oregon
Broadway Building (Hollywood), a short name for the Broadway Hollywood Building.